David Lawrence Borger (born 7 September 1969) is a former Australian politician. He represented the Electoral district of Granville for the Labor Party in the New South Wales Legislative Assembly from 2007 until 2011. Borger was Minister for Roads, Housing and Minister for Western Sydney in the Rees and Keneally Labor Government. Borger was appointed the inaugural Western Sydney Director of the Sydney Business Chamber in September 2012.

Early years 

Borger was an elected member of the Parramatta City Council, representing the Elizabeth Macarthur Ward, from 1995 to 2008. At 30 years of age, Borger became the youngest person to hold the office of Lord Mayor of Parramatta City Council. Borger served as Lord Mayor for two terms (1999–2007).

During his first term as Lord Mayor he instigated a fundraising campaign to help community groups that provide services to homeless people in Parramatta. That campaign has already netted $25,000 for the Parramatta Mission's Winter Appeal. He has worked closely with groups such as Shelter NSW, the Wesley Mission and the Exodus Foundation in securing more resources for the homeless during and beyond the Olympic Games.

State politics

Following the retirement of Kim Yeadon, Borger won endorsement and then election for the seat of Granville at the 2007 State election. Borger lost his seat at the 2011 State election to his Liberal opponent Tony Issa.

In the Rees and Keneally Labor Governments, Borger was appointed to the following ministerial portfolios:

Minister for Western Sydney (2008–2011)
Minister for Housing (2008–2009)
Minister Assisting the Minister for Transport and Roads (2009–2010)
Minister for Roads (2010–2011)

As Housing Minister he oversaw the construction of approximately 9,000 new social housing dwellings - including 6,300 through the Nation Building Economic Stimulus Plan.

During this time he championed major reforms to expand the community housing sector in NSW by transferring the title of $2 billion worth of public housing to highly performing community housing associations. This reform allowed community housing to develop a balance sheet, and to trade and develop existing housing assets.

Sydney Business Chamber

Borger was appointed to the position of Western Sydney Director of the Sydney Business Chamber in 2012.

Borger led the Sydney Business Chamber campaign in support of the Western Sydney Airport at Badgerys Creek including establishing the Western Sydney Airport Alliance. He has collaborated with chief executive officers, managing partners and Vice Chancellors to support campaigns like the Powerhouse Museum to Parramatta, the Westmead and Liverpool Innovation Districts, Sydney Olympic Park, Parramatta Light Rail and West Metro.

References

 

New South Wales local councillors
Mayors and Lord Mayors of Parramatta
Members of the New South Wales Legislative Assembly
People from Parramatta
1969 births
Living people
Australian Labor Party members of the Parliament of New South Wales
21st-century Australian politicians